, known in Europe as Super Runabout: The Golden State, is a video game developed by Climax Entertainment/Digital Mayhem for the Dreamcast in 2000. It is the sequel to the PlayStation game Felony 11-79, which was known in Japan as Runabout.

Development
An updated version was made and released in the US as Super Runabout: San Francisco, possibly for easier name recognition and to be more commercial friendly. Released in PAL districts as Super Runabout: The Golden State and finally in Japan again as Super Runabout: San Francisco (the updated version).

Reception

The game received "mixed" reviews according to the review aggregation website Metacritic. Greg Orlando of NextGen said, "Mindlessly fun and often breathlessly destructive, Interplay's car-wreck opus Super Runabout succeeds in spite of its graphics and control issues. There are clipping and collision problems galore, and some of the game's vehicles handle like an oiled sled on ice, but the game remains both eminently enjoyable and highly playable." In Japan, Famitsu gave it a score of 31 out of 40.

References

External links
 

2000 video games
Dreamcast games
Dreamcast-only games
Interplay Entertainment games
Racing video games
Single-player video games
Video game sequels
Video games about police officers
Video games developed in Japan
Video games set in San Francisco
Virgin Interactive games